Ruellia nitens (syn. Dipteracanthus nitens Nees) is a plant native to the Cerrado vegetation of Brazil. This plant is cited in Flora Brasiliensis by Carl Friedrich Philipp von Martius.

External links
  Checklist das Plantas do Nordeste: Ruellia nitens 
  Flora Brasiliensis: Dipteracanthus nitens

nitens
Flora of Brazil